Clervie Ngounoue and Diana Shnaider were the defending champions, but Ngounoue chose not to participate and Shnaider was no longer eligible to participate in junior events.

Renáta Jamrichová and Federica Urgesi won the title, defeating Hayu Kinoshita and Sara Saito in the final, 7–6(7–5), 1–6, [10–7].

Seeds

Draw

Finals

Top half

Bottom half

References

External links 
 Draw at itftennis.com
 Draw at ausopen.com

2023
Girls' doubles